Khvodrowgan (also Romanized as Khvodrowgān and Khowd Rowgān; also known as Khodrowgan and Khowd Row) is a village in Rudkhaneh Rural District, Rudkhaneh District, Rudan County, Hormozgan Province, Iran. At the 2006 census, its population was 122, in 28 families.

References 

Populated places in Rudan County